Ionia is the second studio album by the American dark wave band Lycia, released in 1991 by Projekt Records.

Reception

Ned Raggett of AllMusic gave it 3 out of 5 stars, saying "it's excellent mood music, if you like that kind of mood."

Track listing

Personnel

Lycia
 Mike VanPortfleet – vocals, instruments, mixing

Additional musicians and production
 Susan Jennings – photography
 Sam Rosenthal – mixing
 Will Welch – sampler (8)

Release history

References

External links 
 
 Ionia at Bandcamp
 Ionia at iTunes

1991 albums
Lycia (band) albums
Projekt Records albums